Nynne is a Danish film directed by Jonas Elmer, starring Mille Dinesen. It is based on the bestselling Danish novel Nynnes dagbog (en. Nynne's Diary) by Henriette Lind, Lotte Thorsen and Anette Vestergaard, which again was based on a popular newspaper column in Politiken. Nynne was the fourth-most seen film total in theaters in Denmark in 2005, with 429,301 tickets sold. (The most seen was Harry Potter and the Goblet of Fire).  Dinesen reprised the role in a short series the following year.

Story
The film is about Nynne, who lives in the city. She is single, in her 30s, comforts herself with power shopping, has unsuccessful dates, loves to gossip with her friends, and has a hangover every weekend.

Cast
 Mille Dinesen as Nynne
 Lars Kaalund as Martin
 Jimmi Jørgensen as Daniel
 Mette Agnete Horn as Merete
 Stine Stengade as Natasha
 Claes Bang as Henrik
 Lene Maria Christensen as Beate
 Ole Lemmeke as Poul Erik Ø
 Lars Hjortshøj as Hans
 Anne-Lise Gabold as Henriks mor
 Asta Esper Hagen Andersen as Henriks mormor
 Tatiana Pajkovic as Fiona
 Laura Christensen as Fiona's friend
 Martin Kongstad as domestic worker
 Lærke Winther Andersen as sales assistant
 Christian Tafdrup as guy at restaurant

Soundtrack
The movie's soundtrack was composed by Søren Hyldgaard.

CD track list
 Clark Anderson – "Real Love"
 Terry Walker – "Ain’t No Love"
 Alex – "Os To!"
 Johnny Deluxe – "Det Du Gør"
 Bryan Rice – "No Promises"
 Søs Fenger – "Lykken Vender" (Nynnes Mantra)
 Eddie Holman – "Hey There Lonely Girl"
 Remee Allstars – "My Way"
 Pelding Feat. Joy Morgan – "Little Girl Blue"
 Brinck – "It's My Life"
 Beverley Knight – "Keep This Fire Burning"
 New Originals Feat. Mibb & Michael Carøe – "Superstar"
 Sisse Marie – "Boom"
 Terry Walker – "Whoopsie Daisy Hit’n Run"

Songs in the movie, not listed on the soundtrack CD, include:
 Billie Holiday – "The Man I Love"
 Shirley Bassey – "Big Spender"
 Bing Crosby – "Here Comes Santa Claus"
 Brigitte Bardot – "Ne Me Laisse Pas L'aimer"

External links
 
 

2005 films
2005 romantic comedy films
2000s Danish-language films
Films based on Danish novels
Danish romantic comedy films
Films directed by Jonas Elmer (director)